Ruth Ashley Charman Dalton is a British Labour Party politician and former community worker who has served as the Member of Parliament (MP) for West Lancashire since the 2023 West Lancashire by-election, succeeding Rosie Cooper.

Early life, education and career
Dalton was raised in Leyland, South Ribble, in Lancashire. Her father worked on the factory floor at Leyland Motors, and later set up his own business as a nurseryman. She became aware of the Labour Party at the age of 14, when a customer ordered 40 red rose buttonholes for a by-election count from her father's florist's shop, and joined the party while at university.

She attended All Hallows Catholic High School in Penwortham (1983–1988) and Preston College (1989–1991), and obtained a BA in English and politics (1996) and a DipHE in professional development (voluntary sector) (1997) from Middlesex University.

Dalton worked for Southend-on-Sea Council for 17 years, and at the time of her selection she worked part-time for a Lancashire charity.

Political career 
Dalton was Labour's candidate in Rochford and Southend East in the 2017 and 2019 general elections.

She was selected on 9 October 2022 as Labour's candidate in the West Lancashire by-election. The by-election was triggered by the resignation of Rosie Cooper. Dalton was elected MP with 14,068 votes (62.3%). In her victory speech, Dalton called for a general election.

Dalton took her oath of office on Monday 20 February. She signed an early day motion welcoming the investigation into the 2022 UEFA Champions League final chaos on the same day.

Personal life 
Dalton is a survivor of breast cancer. She is a parent and a carer. Her ex-husband died of kidney cancer.

She identifies as LGBT, and has called herself "a gay woman".

References

External links
 
 

21st-century English women politicians
21st-century LGBT people
Alumni of Middlesex University
English lesbians
English LGBT politicians
Female members of the Parliament of the United Kingdom for English constituencies
LGBT members of the Parliament of the United Kingdom
Labour Party (UK) MPs for English constituencies
Lesbian politicians
Living people
Members of the Parliament of the United Kingdom for constituencies in Lancashire
People from Leyland, Lancashire
UK MPs 2019–present
Year of birth missing (living people)